Krishna Pamani (born 20 May 1950) is an Indian former cricketer. He played two first-class matches for Bengal in 1974/75.

See also
 List of Bengal cricketers

References

External links
 

1950 births
Living people
Indian cricketers
Bengal cricketers
People from Kutch district